The WFIS world jamboree is a Scouting jamboree of the World Federation of Independent Scouts.

Jamborees

3rd Jamboree in Mexico
The 3rd World WFIS Jamboree was held from 16 to 23 July 2011. There were  1000 WFIS members from around 40 countries between 3 and 21 years of age. There were a great variety of activities, including workshops with various NGOs and different indigenous groups, farm activities for Cub Packs, tours in Puebla and Cuetzalan, visits to the preHispanic ruins of Yohualichan, hikes and excursions, treks and cultural activities.

Scouting jamborees